Supadio International Airport (Indonesian: Bandar Udara Internasional Supadio) , formerly known as Sei Durian Airport or Sungai Durian Airport, is an international airport located 17 km from Pontianak, West Kalimantan, Indonesia. The airport is managed by PT. Angkasa Pura II, and takes up 528 ha. The airport serves as the main point of entry to West Kalimantan. The airport serves domestic flights to and from several cities and towns in Indonesia and some limited flights to Kuching and Kuala Lumpur in the neighboring Malaysia. The airport was named the best airport in Asia-Pacific in 2020 (2 to 5 million passengers per annum) by Airports Council International.

The name of the airport is derived from Lieutenant Colonel Supadio, an Indonesian Air Force officer who served Pangkowilud II Banjarmasin, which oversees the Sungai Durian Airbase (the previous name of the airport). Lieutenant Colonel Supadio died in an airplane crash with Colonel (PNB) Nurtanio in Bandung in 1966. The airport area and runway are also shared with the Supadio Airbase, a Type B airbase of the TNI-AU (Indonesian Air Force). It served as the homebase of the Skuadron Udara 1 of the Indonesian Air Force, which consists of a fleet of 18 Hawk 109/209.

The airport previously suffered from overcapacity. A major renovation, which involves the building of a larger and more spacious terminal between 2014 and 2017 dramatically increased the airport's capacity. After the renovation, the airport now has four Jetbridges and is building three more. It will be able to accommodate more than 3.8 million passengers annually. The renovation included the widening and extension of the runway to 2,600-meters in 2020 (start in 2019/2020) and will be operational by the end of 2022, The airport also has a new and higher Air Traffic Control tower, and the apron is able to accommodate up to 14 aircraft.

History

The airport was originally built in the 1940s and was previously named as Sei Durian Airport.
 
After obtaining an agreement with the Pontianak Sultanate, the Pontianak Sultanate decided to give up some land to be used the Dutch colonial government in building an airfield. The Dutch government began to carry out research around the Sei Durian area to decide where to build the airstrip. Finally, the Dutch decided to build the airstrips in Sei Durian due to the consideration of strategic factors of defense. At that time, the Dutch government was involved in World War II against the Empire of Japan.
 
Unfortunately, before the construction of the airstrip started, the Dutch colonial administration capitulated to the Japanese Government. During the Japanese occupation, the Japanese military government decided to proceed with building the airstrip, considering its strategic importance. The Japanese stationed several of its military airplanes in Sei Durian over the course of the war. After the Japanese surrendered in 1945, the airstrip was briefly retaken by the Dutch colonial government, before finally taken over by the new Indonesian government. Over the course of the year, the Indonesian government developed the airport, resulting in its present state.

At the height of the Indonesia-Malaysia Confrontation, several aircraft of the Indonesian Air Force were stationed on Sei Durian Airport, owing to its proximity with Malaysia in subsequent developments, the history of the Sungai Durian Airbase has undergone many series of change processes, ranging from changes in status or air force base type or renaming changes. After hostility ceased, the airbase was upgraded from a Type C Airbase to a Type B Airbase. Currently, Supadio Airport houses the Skuadron Udara 1 of the Indonesian Air Force, composing of a fleet of Hawk 109/209.

In the 1980s, the airport was renamed Supadio Airport. In the 1970s, the first international flight to Kuching in neighbouring Sarawak started, operated by Merpati Nusantara Airlines. In the 1980s, flights to Singapore started, operated by Garuda Indonesia and Merpati Nusantara Airlines. In late-October 1989, Malaysia Airlines also started flight to Pontianak from Kuching. All of these international flights discontinued in 1998 due to the Asian Financial Crisis but the routes to Kuching however has been resumed in mid-1999, operated by 3 different airlines consecutively namely Batavia Air, Kalstar and Xpress Air which suspended services shortly after Wings Air operated the route. Together with Airasia, both airlines operate 14 weekly flights between Pontianak and Kuching. Between early to mid 2010s, there were also short-lived flights to Singapore (operated by Batavia Air) and Johor Bahru (by Xpress Air). Flight to Kuala Lumpur also commenced in late-March 2015, operated by AirAsia.

Expansion
A new terminal building with wide and extended runway is built in the airport. In 2020, the runway will be extended to 2,600 meters. And will be used by the end of 2022. Previously, the 2010–2011 runway has been widened from 30 meters to 45 meters. The new terminal adopts eco-airport and green building concepts and able to serve 3 million passengers annually.

The new terminal was built in two phases. Phase 1 was completed in June 2015.

A new parallel sideways that will connect the 3 new Jetbridges is also being Built. It will increase the capacity of the current terminal building. The new sideways will be completed by 2023.

Airlines and destinations

Passenger

Statistics and traffic

Traffic

Statistics

Military use
Supadio International Airport is also used by 1st Fighter Squadron (Hawk 109/209) & Aviation Squadron 51 (Skadron Udara 51), which operates the CAIG Wing Loong.

Accidents and incidents
 On 19 January 1973, Douglas C-47B PK-EHC of Trans Nusantara Airways crashed on landing and was destroyed in the subsequent fire. All four people on board escaped.
 On 22 November 2004, Sri Hardono, the captain of Garuda Indonesia flight 501, a Boeing 737-500 from Pontianak to Jakarta, was suddenly ill shortly after take-off. Hardono immediately asked permission to the air traffic control to return to the airport. Hardono died shortly after the emergency landing while still in the cockpit. Heart attack was the cause of illness and death. Due to the incident, the airport was temporarily closed for 40 minutes. There were no other injuries or fatalities in this incident.
 On 2 November 2010, Lion Air flight 712, operated by Boeing 737-400 PK-LIQ, overran the runway on landing, coming to rest on its belly. All 174 passengers and crew evacuated by the emergency chutes, with few injuries reported.
 On 1 June 2012, a Sriwijaya Air Boeing 737-400 skidded off the runway in heavy rain. Nobody was hurt, but the plane sustained damage beyond repair.
On 9 January 2021, Sriwijaya Air Flight 182 enroute from Soekarno–Hatta International Airport to Supadio International Airport with 62 people total on board (50 passengers, 12 crew members) disappeared from radar four minutes after takeoff. It was later confirmed by officials that Flight 182 crashed in the waters off the Thousand Islands.

References

External links

 

Airports in West Kalimantan